Montgomery Wilson Slatkin is an American biologist, and professor at University of California, Berkeley.

Education
Slatkin received his undergraduate degree in mathematics from Massachusetts Institute of Technology and his PhD from Harvard University.

Research
Slatkin is faculty of the Slatkin Research Group, in the Center for Theoretical Evolutionary Genomics.

Publications
Slatkin is the author of several books and scientific papers in peer-reviewed scientific journals.

Awards
In 2000, Slatkin won the Sewall Wright Award and is on the Science Board of the Santa Fe Institute.

References 

21st-century American biologists
University of California, Berkeley faculty
Living people
Harvard University alumni
Santa Fe Institute people
Massachusetts Institute of Technology School of Science alumni
Year of birth missing (living people)